Lumpeninae is a subfamily of marine ray-finned fishes, classified within the family Stichaeidae, the pricklebacks or shannies.  These fishes are found in the North Pacific, Arctic and North Atlantic Oceans.

Genera
The subfamily contains the following genera:

References

Stichaeidae
 
Taxa described in 1898
Fish subfamilies